Most Eligible Dallas is American reality television television series on Bravo that premiered on August 15, 2011. The series follows a clique of friends in Dallas, Texas as they navigate through the local social scene.

Cast

 Courtney Kerr — Despite the series not being renewed a second season, Kerr received her own spin-off titled Courtney Loves Dallas which debuted in December 2013.
 Drew Ginsburg
 Glenn Pakulak
 Matt Nordgren
 Neill Skylar
 Tara Harper

Episodes

References

2010s American reality television series
2011 American television series debuts
2011 American television series endings
English-language television shows
Bravo (American TV network) original programming
Television shows set in Dallas